The Sagole Baobab (also Sagole Big Tree, Muri kunguluwa (i.e. tree that roars), or Muvhuyu wa Makhadzi) is the largest baobab tree (Adansonia digitata) in South Africa. It is located east from Tshipise, in Vendaland, Limpopo Province and has a trunk diameter 10.47 metres, circumference 32.89 metres.  It would take 18–20 people to encirle the tree with open hands. To view the tree, there is an entrance fee of ZAR 50 per adult and 25 per kid. 

This is also the stoutest tree in South Africa, after two other large baobabs, the Glencoe and Sunland Baobabs, collapsed in 2009 and 2016 respectively. The Sagole Baobab has the largest size and retains the appearance of a single tree. It is 22 metres high with a crown diameter of 38.2 metres.

A breeding colony of mottled spinetails (Telacanthura ussheri) are resident in the tree.

See also
 List of individual trees

References

External links 
 Wondermondo: Sagole Baobab

Individual baobab trees
Geography of Limpopo
Individual trees in South Africa